The year 1623 in music involved some significant events.

Events
 Drum cymbals are first made commercially by the predecessor of the Avedis Zildjian Company at Constantinople in Ottoman Turkey. Zildjian  cymbals were created in 1618 by Avedis Zildjian, an alchemist who was looking for a way to turn base metal into gold; he created an alloy combining tin, copper, and silver into a sheet of metal that could make musical sounds without shattering. Avedis was given the name of Zildjian (Zilciyân) by the Sultan Osman II[3] (from the Turkish word zil cymbal, dji maker/seller, -ian a common suffix used in Armenian last names) and begins an industry in this year, the details of whose main product remain secret for generations as it becomes family tradition that only the company's heirs would know the manufacturing process. The company will still be operating, from Massachusetts, in the 21st century.

Publications 
Antonio Cifra – Sixth book of madrigals for five voices with basso continuo (Rome: Luca Antonio Soldi)
Ignazio Donati –  (Pastoral psalms) for six voices plus a six-voice ripieno (Venice: Alessandro Vincenti), also includes a mass
Melchior Franck
 for four voices (Coburg: Andreas Forckel), settings of gospel texts for the whole year
 for five, six, and eight voices or instruments (Coburg: Andreas Forckel for Salomon Gruner), a collection of secular songs
 for four, five, and six voices or instruments (Coburg: Salomon Gruner), a collection of songs and dances
 for five voices (Coburg: Kaspar Bertsch), a wedding motet
 for six voices (Coburg: Andreas Forckel), a wedding motet
 for four voices (Coburg: Kaspar Bertsch), a funeral motet
Orlando Gibbons – The Hymns and Songs of the Church (London: George Wither)
Giovanni Girolamo Kapsberger
Second book of arias (Rome: Luca Antonio Soldi)
Claudio Monteverdi –  (Venice: Bartolomeo Magni), the only surviving excerpt from his opera, 
Peter Philips –  for four, five, six, eight, and nine voices with organ bass (Antwerp: Pierre Phalèse)
Alessandro Piccinini –  (Bologna: the heirs of Giovanni Paolo Moscatelli)
Isaac Posch –  for one, two, three, and four voices or instruments with organ bass (Nuremberg: Simon Halbmayer)

Classical music 
 Salamone Rossi – , a collection of Jewish liturgical music

Opera

Births 
 July 6 – Jacopo Melani, violinist and composer (died 1676)
 August 5 – Antonio Cesti, composer (died 1669)
 date unknown – Johann Heinrich Schmelzer, violinist and composer (died 1688)
 probable – Dietrich Becker, violinist and composer (died c.1679)

Deaths
 January/February – Mogens Pedersøn, instrumentalist and composer (born c.1583)
 May 4 – Asprilio Pacelli, composer (born 1570)
 May 5 – Philip Rosseter, musician and composer (born 1567/8)
 July 4 – William Byrd, composer (born 1543)
 November 30 – Thomas Weelkes, English composer (born 1576)
 date unknown
 Giovanni Bernardino Nanino, composer, teacher and singing master (born c.1560)
 Tulsidas, Hindu philosopher, composer, and poet (born 1532)

References 

 
Music
17th century in music
Music by year